Anything Goes is an album by Harpers Bizarre, released in 1967.

Two bonus tracks were added to the 2001 CD issue of this title:  the 45 version of "Cotton Candy Sandman" by Kenny Rankin, and the theme to the TV series Malibu U by Don and Dick Addrisi.

The title track was used in the opening montage of the 1970 film The Boys in the Band.

Track listing
"(Intro) This Is Only the Beginning" (Ted Koehler, Harold Arlen)
"Anything Goes" (Cole Porter)
"Two Little Babes in the Wood" (Cole Porter)
"The Biggest Night of Her Life" (Randy Newman)
"Pocketful of Miracles" (Sammy Cahn, Jimmy Van Heusen)
"Snow" (Randy Newman)
"Chattanooga Choo Choo" (Mack Gordon, Harry Warren)
"Hey You in the Crowd" (Dick Scoppettone, Ted Templeman)
"Louisiana Man" (Doug Kershaw)
"Milord" (Georges Moustaki, Marguerite Monnot)
"Virginia City" (Dick Scoppettone, Ted Templeman)
"Jessie" (Mike Gordon, Jimmy Griffin)
"You Need a Change" (David Blue)
"High Coin" (Van Dyke Parks)

References

1967 albums
Harpers Bizarre albums
Albums produced by Lenny Waronker
Warner Records albums